Turriviridae is a family of viruses; it contains only one genus, Alphaturrivirus.  The archaea Sulfolobus solfataricus serve as natural hosts. There are two species in the genus Alphaturrivirus.

Taxonomy
The genus contains the following species:
 Sulfolobus turreted icosahedral virus 1

Structure
Viruses in Turriviridae have icosahedral geometries, and T=31 symmetry. The diameter is around 74 nm. Genomes are linear.

Life cycle
Viral replication is cytoplasmic. Entry into the host cell is achieved by adsorption into the host cell. DNA-templated transcription is the method of transcription. Sulfolobus solfataricus serves as the natural host. Transmission routes are passive diffusion.

References

External links
 Viralzone: Turriviridae
 ICTV

Turriviridae
Virus families